The bondfin dottyback (Assiculoides desmonotus) is a species of ray-finned fish from the subfamily Pseudochrominae, part of the dottyback family Pseudochromidae. It is found in the eastern Indian Ocean off the north-western coasts of Australia. It is the only species in the monotypic genus Assiculoides.

References

Pseudochrominae
Fish described in 1997
Monotypic fish genera